Micratopus is a genus of ground beetles in the family Carabidae. There are about five described species in Micratopus.

Species
These five species belong to the genus Micratopus:
 Micratopus aenescens (LeConte, 1848)  (North America)
 Micratopus exiguus (R.F.Sahlberg, 1844)  (Brazil)
 Micratopus insularis Darlington, 1934  (the Lesser Antilles)
 Micratopus parviceps Darlington, 1934  (Cuba)
 Micratopus withycombei Jeannel, 1932  (the Lesser Antilles)

References

Trechinae